David W.  MacLennan (born 1958/59) is an American businessman, the chairman and chief executive officer (CEO) of Cargill.

MacLennan received a BA in English from Amherst College, followed by an MBA in Finance from the University of Chicago.

MacLennan has been chairman and CEO of Cargill since 2013, when he succeeded Greg Page. Under MacLennan’s leadership, Cargill has faced numerous controversies and criticisms.

Criticism 
In 2019, former U.S. Congressman Henry A. Waxman, in a report by Mighty Earth, called Cargill "the worst company in the world" and noted that it drives "the most important problems facing our world" (deforestation, pollution, climate change, exploitation) "at a scale that dwarfs their closest competitors."

Personal life 
He is married to Kathleen MacLennan, and they have three adult children.

References

1950s births
Living people
Cargill people
Amherst College alumni
University of Chicago Booth School of Business alumni
American chief executives of Fortune 500 companies